Vladislav Sergeyevich Nikityanov (born 10 October 1993) is a Russian football player. He plays for FC Peresvet Domodedovo.

Club career
He made his debut in the Russian Professional Football League for FC Kolomna on 10 April 2015 in a game against FC Strogino Moscow.

He made his Russian Football National League debut for FC Khimki on 12 May 2018 in a game against FC Rotor Volgograd.

References

External links
 
 
 Profile by Sportbox

1993 births
Sportspeople from Gomel
Living people
Russian footballers
Association football midfielders
FC Saturn Ramenskoye players
FC Khimki players